Survival of the Richest is an American reality television show on The WB that first aired on March 31, 2006, in which seven "rich kids" who had a combined net worth of over $3 billion were forced to work together with 7 "poor kids" who had a combined debt of $150,000, through a series of challenges to win the grand prize of US$200,000. It was hosted by Hal Sparks.

Rich Kids
 Kat Moon, Religious Empire Heiress, Family Worth: $989 Million (voted off)
 Elizabeth Lewis, Yellow Pages Heiress, Family Worth: Over $1 Billion (eliminated)
 Hunter Maats, Dutch Aristocracy, Family Worth: $20 Million  (voted off)
 Liz Rubin, Real Estate Heiress, Family Worth: $15 Million (voted off)
 Nick Movs, LA Socialite & Heir to Ritz Carlton Hotel Fortune, Family Worth: $500 Million  (voted off)
 Sam Durrani a/k/a Saima Shahnawaz Khan Durrani, Family Worth: $1 Billion (eliminated)
 T.R. Youngblood, Auto Franchise Heir, Family Worth: $20 Million (winner)

Poor Kids

 Tracy Huffstetler, Nanny, Debt: $19,000 (eliminated)
 Johanna Allio, Single Mother, Debt: $30,000 (voted off)
 Esmerelda Nuñez, Sales Clerk, Debt: $1,200 (voted off)
 Marcus Foy, Unemployed, Debt: $7,000 (voted off) (former competitor on The Janice Dickinson Modeling Agency)
 Michael Keck, Unemployed Receptionist, Debt: $25,000 (voted off)
 Jacob LeBlanc, Construction Worker, Debt: $35,000 (eliminated)
 Jim Perkins, Student, Debt: $40,000 (winner)

Teams

 Nick & Michael (voted off)
 Liz & Marcus (voted off)
 Elizabeth & Tracy (lost in challenge)
 Kat & Esmerelda (voted off)
 Hunter & Johanna (voted off)
 Sammy & Jacob (lost in challenge)
 T.R. & Jim (winners)

Tasks

Viewership

External links
 
 
 Survival of the Richest on BuddyTV

The WB original programming
2006 American television series debuts
2006 American television series endings
2000s American reality television series
English-language television shows